The Phoronis is a lost work by the fifth-century Greek historian Hellanicus of Lesbos. It takes its title from the local Tirynthian culture hero Phoroneus. It was an account of Argolic tradition, consisting mostly of genealogies, with short accounts of various events included, from the time of Phoroneus, the "father of mortal men", to the "Return of the Heracleidae".

Notes

References
The Encyclopædia Britannica: A Dictionary of Arts, Sciences, and General Literature, Volume 11, Werner Company, 1905.
 Fowler, R. L. (2000), Early Greek Mythography: Volume 1: Text and Introduction, Oxford University Press, 2000. .
 Fowler, R. L. (2013), Early Greek Mythography: Volume 2: Commentary, Oxford University Press, 2013. .
 Müller, Karl Wilhelm Ludwig (1841), Fragmenta Historicorum Graecorum, Volume I, 1841. Internet Archive.
 Müller, Karl Wilhelm Ludwig (1851), Fragmenta Historicorum Graecorum, Volume IV, 1851. Internet Archive.
 Mure, William, A Critical History of the Language and Literature of Ancient Greece, Volume 4, Longman, Brown, Green, and Longmans, 1853.
 West, M. L. (2003), Greek Epic Fragments: From the Seventh to the Fifth Centuries BC. Edited and translated by Martin L. West. Loeb Classical Library No. 497. Cambridge, Massachusetts: Harvard University Press, 2003.  . Online version at Harvard University Press.

Ancient Greece